Coop Forum is a Swedish hypermarket (combined supermarket and department store) chain.  The brand is owned by Coop Butiker and Stormarknader AB, who also run most of the stores.  Some stores are run by regional co-operative societies through an agreement with Coop.

The chain was created through the conversion of many B&W, Robin Hood, Prix and Obs! stores into the Coop Forum format in addition to new openings.

The largest Coop Forum stores carry a full hypermarket range including groceries, clothes, homewares and electrical goods.  The smaller stores are more compact selling only a full range of groceries and a selection of homewares.  Many Coop Forum stores also had a branch of Coop Bygg attached. Coop Bygg was a brand of small DIY store.

As part of a restructuring, almost all Coop Forum stores have been rebranded as Stora Coop.  only three stores remain under the Coop Forum brand.

References

Further reading
 
 
 
 
 
 
 
 
  

Supermarkets of Sweden
Cooperatives in Sweden
Companies based in Solna Municipality